The SARP Award of the Year – is one of the two most prestigious annual architectural prizes in Poland. It is awarded by the Association of Polish Architects (SARP) to the designers of the most significant contemporary buildings, and it's carried out under the honourable patronage of the Ministry of Culture and National Heritage.

It is awarded to the individual architects, as well as to the local SARP branches, architectural practices and design studios, public administration bodies, and the authorised by the project leaders architectural editorial offices.

Winners

References

Architecture in Poland
Polish awards
Architecture awards